This is an incomplete list of wars between entities that have a constitutionally democratic form of government and actually practice it. Two points are required: that there has been a war, and that there are democracies on at least two opposing sides. For many of these entries, whether there has been a war, or a democracy, is a debatable question; all significant views should be given.

Definition dependence

Almost all of these depend on the definition of "democracy" (and of "war") employed. As James Lee Ray points out, with a sufficiently restrictive definition of democracy, there will be no wars between democracies: define democracy as true universal suffrage, the right of all – including children – to vote, and there have been no democracies, and so no wars between them.

On the other hand, Ray lists the following as having been called wars between democracies,  with broader definitions of democracy: The American Revolution including the Fourth Anglo-Dutch War, the French Revolutionary Wars, the War of 1812, the Belgian Revolution, the Sonderbund War, the war of 1849 between the Roman Republic and the Second French Republic, the American Civil War, the Spanish–American War, the Second Philippine War, the Second Boer War, World War I, World War II (as a whole, and also the Continuation War by itself), the 1947–1949 Palestine war, the Indo-Pakistani War of 1947–1948, the Six-Day War, the Yugoslav Wars, and the First Nagorno-Karabakh War. Many Native American tribes also had democratic forms of government, and they often fought each other up until the late 19th century, as did many tribes of Norsemen during the Middle Ages.

Similarly, the school of Ted Robert Gurr, founder of the Polity IV dataset, divides regimes into three classes: democracies, autocracies, and "anocracies"; the last being the sort of weak or new states which are marginal democracies or marginal autocracies; many of the wars below involve weak or marginal democracies.

Early democracy

Greek democracies

The Peloponnesian War included a great many conflicts among Greek city-states. The principal war was between Athens and its allies (most of them democracies) on one side, and Sparta and its allies (most of them oligarchies—although most of them held elections among a citizen body) on the other. But the war lasted for twenty-seven years, with a brief armistice, and a great many side-conflicts occurred; and states changed from democracy to oligarchy and back again. Most notable of the wars between democracies was the Sicilian Expedition, 415–413 BC, in which Athens went to war with Syracuse. Bruce Russett finds 13 conflicts between "clear" democratic pairs (most of these being Athens and allies in the Sicilian Expedition) and 25 involving "other" democratic pairs. Classicist Mogens Herman Hansen thinks one of Russett's examples unlikely, but adds several instances of wars between democracies before and after the Peloponnesian War.

Roman Republic

The constitution of the Roman Republic, before its collapse in the late 1st century BC, is amply documented; its magistrates (including the Roman Senate, which was composed of current and former magistrates) were elected by universal suffrage by adult (male) citizens; all male citizens were eligible. There was a political class of wealthy men; most successful candidates belonged to this class, and all of them were supported by a party drawn from it, but this does not distinguish Rome from other democracies—nor, indeed, from non-democratic states; freedom of speech was, however, a characteristic difference between the Republic and the later Roman Empire.
 The Punic Wars. The old constitution of Carthage, before the First Punic War, was described by Aristotle as a mixture of democracy and oligarchy; after the disastrous end of that war, about 240 BC, there was a democratic change, the direct election of a pair of executives, and the Second Punic War was fought under that constitution; there continued to be an oligarchic party.  There were several further changes of party, and democratic reforms; the election of the democratic party, which favored a less passive foreign policy, in 151 BC provoked Rome to begin the Third Punic War two years later.

18th century
 The Quasi-War, a naval conflict from 1798 to 1800 between the United States and the French Republic. Neither side declared war.

19th century
 Mexican–American War
 Sonderbund War (civil war between cantons in Switzerland)
 War of 1849 between the Roman Republic and the French Second Republic
 War of 1857–1860 between Peru and Ecuador
 Spanish–American War
 Philippine–American War
 First and Second Boer Wars between the United Kingdom and the South African Republic/Orange Free State

20th century
 First Balkan War (1912–13): The Young Turks had re-established constitutional government in Ottoman Turkey in 1908, and continued to struggle for greater liberalization; the "relatively democratic" Constitution of Serbia had been restored in 1903, and attained complete openness of executive recruitment. Serbia and its allies, the constitutional monarchies of Greece and Bulgaria, won the war; Turkey suffered a military coup as a result of defeat.
 First World War: The Polity IV dataset does not rank any of the Central Powers as democracies, although the component of democracy for Germany had been higher than that of autocracy since the 1890s, when Bismarck was replaced by Leo von Caprivi; neither does the somewhat controversial ranking of Tatu Vanhanen. On the other hand, all of the Central Powers had elected parliaments; the Reichstag had been elected by universal suffrage, and voted on whether a credit essential to the German conduct of the war should be granted. Whether this is democratic control over the foreign policy of the Kaiser is "a difficult case"; Michael W. Doyle concludes, however, that the government was not absolutely dependent on the Reichstag – and that Germany was a dyarchy, effectively a mixture of two different constitutions, and democratic on internal affairs.
 Irish War of Independence: A colonial war taking place from January 1919 to July 1921, over that period a total of 2,300 died from the war 900 of which were civilians. In the December 1918 general election Sinn Féin won 72% of the seats in Ireland which formed the democratic mandate for Irish Independence and the formation of the new parliament of Ireland.
 Polish–Lithuanian War: Fought in 1920, with about 1000 estimated battle deaths. In both states, elections had been held with universal suffrage. In the polity scale, Poland received a +8 rating in combined democracy/autocracy in 1920, while Lithuania received a +7 in democracy and a +4 in combined democracy/autocracy. The conflict is seen by both Polish and Lithuanian historians as a part of the wars of independence from the Soviet Union.
 Continuation War (World War II): During the Second World War, a formal state of war between Great Britain (and Australia and Canada) versus Finland existed due to Finland going to war with their ally the Soviet Union in 1941. There was slight conflict between the United Kingdom and Finland, including an air raid against Finnish territory, with associated attacks on Finnish shipping, although that took place some months before the declaration of war.
 1947–1949 Palestine war: as against Lebanon; Israel had not yet held elections.
 First Kashmir War: Ranked as a full-scale war between democracies in the International Crisis Behavior dataset; they present a table of crises ranking it as a full-scale war, cite it as an example of a crisis where both regimes were of the same type, and discuss the influence of India's democracy on the crisis and the related crises over other princely states. There were fewer than a thousand battlefield casualties in this war. Both countries, then Dominions, then had governments based on the Government of India Act 1935, implemented 1937, which set up Westminster democracy for all of British India; in Pakistan, the politicians, at odds with the civilian bureaucracy, failed to maintain civilian control over the military, and converted the Governor-Generalship into a political office; there was a military coup ten years after the war; the Polity IV dataset counts it as anocratic until 1957–58 (see above), the years before the coup; the same dataset shows India as having been a stable democracy throughout the period.
Cod Wars: Protracted fishing disputes between the United Kingdom and Iceland, opposing the naval forces of both countries.
 Six-Day War: The Lebanese Air Force intervened against Israel, while both Israel and Lebanon were democratic states.
 Football War (Soccer War), fought between El Salvador and Honduras in 1969.
 Turkish invasion of Cyprus: An attack by Turkey, which had a new democratic government since 1973; Cyprus had been a constitutional democracy, although one with severe intercommunal problems, since independence in 1958; the Turkish invasion was a response to a coup. The democratic order of the Republic of Cyprus was restored three days after the invasion, and the war continued for another month. Page Fortna regards this as a debatable case of dual democracy.
 Paquisha War: War fought in 1981 between Ecuador and Peru. The leaders of both countries had been democratically elected. Ecuador receives a rating of +9 in the polity scale of combined democracy/autocracy, while Peru receives a +7, meaning that both countries are classified as democratic, and Ecuador even as "very democratic". However, the Peruvian democracy was less than one year old and the Ecuadorian less than 3 years. In addition, both nations lacked democratic control over their militaries.
 First Nagorno-Karabakh War: Armenia and Azerbaijan became multiparty democracies after their declarations of independence in 1991.
 Yugoslav Wars: Bosnia, Croatia, Slovenia, Serbia and Montenegro were all multiparty democracies.
 Cenepa War: A brief 1995 continuation of the Paquisha War between Ecuador and Peru.

See also

Democratic empire
Democratic peace theory

References

War and politics
Wars between democracies
Wars between democracies
Democracies, between
Democracy